Beer in Northern Ireland has been influenced by immigration into Ulster, especially from Scotland, and the drinking habits in Ireland until the partition of Ireland. Whiskey drinking was always a tradition with Guinness from Dublin being a strong influence in the style of beer drunk in the 19th and 20th centuries. Brewing traditions almost ceased to exist as smaller breweries closed, or were taken over, and then the large breweries in turn closed down their facilities. The Campaign for Real Ale (CAMRA) was founded in 1971; however, it was 10 years before the first new brewery, Hilden Brewing, opened its doors.

Most microbreweries in Northern Ireland find it difficult to sell beer in draught form due to the local tied-pubs issues, where most pubs are owned by Diageo (Guinness), C&C Group (Tennent's) or Molson Coors Brewing Company.

History

The Celtic tradition of brewing beer almost certainly existed in Ireland from before 1,000 BC using barley. The Roman Emperor Julian the Apostate, in a 1,600-year-old poem, described Celtic beer as smelling “like a billy goat.”  Historically Ireland produced ale without the use of hops, as the plant is not native to Ireland, which led in the 18th century to importing quantities of hops from England.

During the 18th century, the Irish Parliament used taxation to encourage brewing at the expense of distilling, reasoning that beer was less harmful than whiskey. In the 1760s about 600,000 barrels of beer were brewed annually in Ireland. In the 1760s, the Royal Dublin Society offered prizes to brewers who used the most Irish hops and those that produced the most Porter.

During the interwar period in Northern Ireland, "many drinkers preferred whiskey to beer."

The Caffrey's Ulster Brewery, established in Belfast in 1897 and taken over by Bass in 1974, closed in 2004, so ending big company brewing in Northern Ireland. Stout is the most preferred beer in Northern Ireland, with lager second and bitter beer as a distant third preference. Guinness, brewed at St James's Gate Brewery in Dublin, is still a popular stout beer in Northern Ireland.

Hilden Brewing Company claims to be Ireland's current oldest microbrewery, founded in 1981.

In 2007, Clotworthy Dobbin, produced by Whitewater Brewing Company, was judged one of the best 50 beers in the world.

The number of microbreweries in Northern Ireland has significantly increased in recent years, from 5 in 2012 to 30 in 2017.

For the past number of years Northern Ireland's craft breweries have called for a change in the law, which currently prevents them selling their produce directly to the customer on site or online. This would mean they don't have to incur additional costs using a third party for sales.

List of Northern Ireland breweries

See also

 Beer and breweries by region
 Beer in the United Kingdom
 Beer in England
 Beer in Scotland
 Beer in Wales
 Beer in Ireland
 List of breweries in Ireland

References

External links
 Society of Independent Brewers
 Campaign for Real Ale Northern Ireland
 NI Breweries - Quare Swally NI
 NI Breweries - Tilt n Pour 
 Craft Beer in Belfast, Northern Ireland - Craft & Slice

 
Northern ireland
Beer in the United Kingdom